The Egyptian Revolution of 1952, also known as the 1952 Coup d'état and 23 July Revolution, was a period of profound political, economic, and societal change in Egypt that began on 23 July 1952 with the toppling of King Farouk in a coup d'état by the Free Officers Movement, a group of army officers led by Mohamed Naguib and Gamal Abdel Nasser. The Revolution ushered in a wave of revolutionary politics in the Arab World, and contributed to the escalation of decolonisation, and the development of Third World solidarity during the Cold War.

Though initially focused on grievances against King Farouk, the movement had more wide-ranging political ambitions. In the first three years of the Revolution, the Free Officers moved to abolish the constitutional monarchy and aristocracy of Egypt and Sudan, establish a republic, end the British occupation of the country, and secure the independence of Sudan (previously governed as an condominium of Egypt and the United Kingdom). The revolutionary government adopted a staunchly nationalist, anti-imperialist agenda, which came to be expressed chiefly through Arab nationalism, and international non-alignment.

The Revolution was faced with immediate threats from Western imperial powers, particularly the United Kingdom, which had occupied Egypt since 1882, and France, both of whom were wary of rising nationalist sentiment in territories under their control throughout Africa, and the Arab World. The ongoing state of war with the State of Israel also posed a serious challenge, as the Free Officers increased Egypt's already strong support of the Palestinians. These two issues converged in the fifth year of the Revolution when Egypt was invaded by the United Kingdom, France, and the State of Israel in the Suez Crisis of 1956 (known in Egypt as the Tripartite Aggression). Despite enormous military losses, the war was seen as a political victory for Egypt, especially as it left the Suez Canal in uncontested Egyptian control for the first time since 1875, erasing what was seen as a mark of national humiliation. This strengthened the appeal of the revolution in other Arab countries.

Wholesale agrarian reform, and huge industrialisation programmes were initiated in the first decade and half of the Revolution, leading to an unprecedented period of infrastructure building, and urbanisation. By the 1960s, Arab socialism had become a dominant theme, transforming Egypt into a centrally planned economy. Official fear of a Western-sponsored counter-revolution, domestic religious extremism, potential communist infiltration, and the conflict with the State of Israel were all cited as reasons compelling severe and longstanding restrictions on political opposition, and the prohibition of a multi-party system. These restrictions on political activity would remain in place until the presidency of Anwar Sadat from 1970 onwards, during which many of the policies of the Revolution were scaled back or reversed.

The early successes of the Revolution encouraged numerous other nationalist movements in other countries, such as Algeria, where there were anti-imperialist and anti-colonial rebellions against European empires. It also inspired the toppling of existing pro-Western monarchies and governments in the MENA region.

The Revolution is commemorated each year on 23 July.

Background and Causes

Muhammad Ali dynasty
The history of Egypt during the 19th and early 20th centuries was defined by the vastly different reigns of successive members of the Muhammad Ali dynasty, and the gradually increasing intrusion in to Egyptian affairs of the Great Powers, particularly the United Kingdom. From 1805, Egypt underwent a period of rapid modernisation under Muhammad Ali Pasha, who declared himself Khedive in defiance of his nominal suzerain, the Ottoman Sultan. Within a matter of decades, Muhammad Ali transformed Egypt from a neglected Ottoman province to being a virtually independent state that temporarily rivalled the Ottoman Empire itself for dominance in the Eastern Mediterranean, and the Mashreq. After Muhammad Ali's death, however, Egypt's fortunes oscillated, as his successors Abbas I and Sa'id halted his reforms, and squandered the economic and military might that he had developed.

This decline was reversed under Isma'il the Magnificent, who undertook massive modernization programmes, and campaigns of military expansion in Sudan, and East Africa. Isma'il greatly accelerated the enfranchisement of the Egyptian peasantry, and middle class, who had been politically and economically marginalized by the wealthy elites of Egyptian society. Isma'il also established Egypt's first parliament. Coupled with his powerful espousal of Egyptian statehood, this contributed to the growth of Egyptian nationalism, particularly within the army.

Yet, Isma'il's grand policies were ruinously expensive, and financial pressure eventually compelled him to sell Egypt's shares in the Universal Company of the Maritime Canal of Suez, the company that owned the 99-year lease to manage the Suez Canal. The sale of the Canal mere years after it had been constructed at the cost of some 80,000 Egyptian lives was seen as a national humiliation, particularly as it in effect granted the purchaser, the United Kingdom, a basis for interfering in Egyptian affairs. Shortly thereafter, the United Kingdom along with the other Great Powers deposed Isma'il in favour of his son, Tewfik Pasha.

Tewfik was seen as a puppet of the foreign powers who had deposed his father, a perception heightened by his repressive policies. Discontent with Tewfik's rule ignited the Orabi Revolt of 1881 led by nationalist army officers and soldiers under Ahmed Orabi. Orabi came from a peasant family, and his rise through the ranks of the military in spite of his humble background had been made possible by the reforms of Isma'il, reforms which he saw as being under attack by Tewfik. The prospect of revolutionary instability in Egypt, and the inferred danger to the Suez Canal, prompted the United Kingdom to intervene militarily in support of Tewfik.

British occupation
Though legally a self-governing vassal state of the Ottoman Empire, Egypt had been virtually independent since 1805, with its own hereditary monarchy, military, legal system, currency, and empire (chiefly in Sudan). The brief Anglo-Egyptian War that resulted from the United Kingdom's support of the Khedive did not alter the Khedivate of Egypt's de jure status, however, it left the United Kingdom in de facto control over the country, a state of affairs that became known as the veiled protectorate. In the years that followed, the United Kingdom would cement its political and military position in Egypt, and subsequently in Egypt's domains in Sudan, with the British high representative in Cairo exercising more power than the Khedive himself. In 1888, at the Convention of Constantinople, the United Kingdom won the right to protect the Suez Canal with military force, giving Britain a permanent base from which to dominate Egyptian politics

In 1899, the United Kingdom forced Tewfik's successor as Khedive, the nationalist Abbas II, to transform Sudan from an integral part of Egypt into a condominium in which sovereignty would be shared between Egypt and the United Kingdom. Once established, the condominium witnessed ever-decreasing Egyptian control, and would for most of its existence be governed in practice by the United Kingdom through the Governor-General in Khartoum. For the remainder of his reign, this would be one of the flashpoints between the nationalist Khedive Abbas II and the United Kingdom, with Abbas seeking to arrest and reverse the process of increasing British control in Egypt and Sudan.

Following the Ottoman Empire's entry in to the First World War as a member of the Central Powers in 1914, the United Kingdom deposed Abbas II in favour of his pro-British uncle, Hussein Kamal. The legal fiction of Ottoman sovereignty was terminated, and the Sultanate of Egypt, destroyed by the Ottoman Empire in 1517, was re-established with Hussein Kamal as Sultan. Despite the restoration of the nominal sultanate, British power in Egypt and Sudan was undiminished, as the United Kingdom declared Egypt to be a formal protectorate of the United Kingdom. Whilst Egypt was not annexed to the British Empire, with the British King never becoming sovereign of Egypt, Egypt's status as a protectorate precluded any actual independence for the sultanate. For all intents and purposes, the Sultanate of Egypt was as much controlled by the United Kingdom as the Khedivate of Egypt had been.

Rising nationalist anger at British control led to the Egyptian Revolution of 1919, prompting the United Kingdom to recognise Egyptian independence in 1922 as the Kingdom of Egypt. Egyptian nationalists, and Sudanese favouring union with Egypt, demanded that Sudan be included within the bounds of the kingdom, with the term "Kingdom of Egypt and Sudan" entering the nationalist vernacular. However, in the terms of the legal instrument by which the United Kingdom recognised Egyptian independence, the British government specifically reserved the issue of the governance of Sudan as a question to be resolved in the future.

During the Second World War, Egypt was a major Allied base for the North African campaign. Egypt remained officially neutral under the closing weeks of the war, however, its territory became a battlefield between the Allies and Axis Powers. In 1942, the refusal of Egypt's young King Farouk to submit to British demands was followed by the Abdeen Palace Incident, in which the British military surrounded Farouk's palace, and ordered him to appoint a Prime Minister selected by the United Kingdom or face immediate bombardment. Though nationalist army officers, including Mohamed Naguib, appealed to Farouk to resist, the deployment of British tanks and artillery outside the Royal palace forced the King to concede. Farouk's surrender to British demands permanently dented the credibility of the monarchy, and convinced many Egyptian nationalists that only the removal of the Muhammad Ali dynasty could bring an end to the United Kingdom's occupation of Egypt and Sudan.

Post-War period
After the war, British policy remained focused on control of the Suez Canal, which was vital for imperial trade. The continued presence of British forces on Egyptian and Sudanese soil inflamed nationalist, and anti-monarchical sentiment. This was exacerbated by the loss of 78% of Palestine in the Palestine War of 1948–1949. Nationalists, particularly in the army, blamed King Farouk for the defeat. Moreover, notwithstanding Farouk's nationalist credentials, as demonstrated by his earlier defiance of British policies, his maladministration of the country's affairs, and alleged corruption, were seen as enabling the continuing British occupation. The factors led to widespread accusations of corruption against the King and his court.

At this stage, nationalists in the army began to coalesce in opposition to the monarchy, and the United Kingdom. The Free Officers Movement was formed by a group of reform-minded officers which was backed by the Soviet Union, and the United States, and centred around a young officer named Gamal Abdel Nasser. The Free Officers recruited the nationally famous war hero General Mohamed Naguib to be their leader to show their seriousness, and attract more army followers.

In the warning that Naguib conveyed to King Farouk on 26 July upon the King's abdication, he provided a summary of the reasons for their revolt against the King:
In view of what the country has suffered in the recent past, the complete vacuity prevailing in all corners as a result of your bad behavior, your toying with the constitution, and your disdain for the wants of the people, no one rests assured of life, livelihood, and honor. Egypt's reputation among the peoples of the world has been debased as a result of your excesses in these areas to the extent that traitors and bribe-takers find protection beneath your shadow in addition to security, excessive wealth, and many extravagances at the expense of the hungry and impoverished people. You manifested this during and after the Palestine War in the corrupt arms scandals and your open interference in the courts to try to falsify the facts of the case, thus shaking faith in justice. Therefore, the army, representing the power of the people, has empowered me to demand that Your Majesty abdicate the throne to His Highness Crown Prince Ahmed Fuad, provided that this is accomplished at the fixed time of 12 o'clock noon today (Saturday, 26 July 1952, the 4th of Zul Qa'ada, 1371), and that you depart the country before 6 o'clock in the evening of the same day. The army places upon Your Majesty the burden of everything that may result from your failure to abdicate according to the wishes of the people.
The leadership of the Kingdom of Egypt was seen as corrupt, with its elites viewed as either too incompetent and fearful to resist the United Kingdom, or actively pro-British. Moreover, the lavish lifestyle of these same elites seemed provocative to the Free Officers Movement, most of whom were from austere backgrounds. Government policies completed the image of the Egyptian state being a puppet in the hands of the British government. This general sense of grievance against the upper eschelons of Egyptian society extended to the great national institutions, such as the palace, the police, parliament, and the main political parties.

In addition to allegations of anti-British sentiment, a CIA document dated 23 July 1952 stated that the dissatisfaction within the army over corruption in high command began in 1948 after the discovery of an arms scandal during the Palestine conflict. It's important to note that the document does not specifically list a reasoning of an arms scandal, yet that becomes a most logical theory. The loss of the 1948 war in Palestine led to the Free Officers' blame of the King, and their promotion of that feeling among the Egyptian people. Tensions between the military and the monarchy resulted in the removal and arrest of Commander in Chief of the Armed Forces Haidar Pasha, Chief of Staff Harid Pasha and other high-ranking officers. However, scandal subsided over time and the King was able to eventually reappoint Haidar and Harid to their old positions.

Prelude
During the winter of 1951–1952 nationalist police officers began protecting and promoting fedayeen (the Egyptian resistance) attacks on British authorities in Cairo, Alexandria, and the Suez Canal (Suez). After repelling a particularly devastating attack on British shipping and facilities near Ismailia which resulted in the death of several British soldiers, British troops tracked the fedayeen into the city. On 25 January 1952, British troops discovered the fedayeen had retreated into the local police barracks. When the police refused to surrender the fedayeen, the British officer attempted to negotiate the surrender of the police and the fedayeen. When their negotiator was killed in the parley by the fedayeen, the British force attacked the Egyptian police barracks in Ismailia. Fifty Egyptian police officers were killed and one hundred were wounded. Egypt erupted in fury.

Subsequently, Free Officer Movement cells initiated riots in Cairo which led to arsons. Without suppression from local fire brigades, these arson attacks further inflamed more rioting. American and Soviet newspapers promoted the incident on global wire outlets as the "Cairo Fires" and suggested they were seen as further evidence of the beginning of the end of the monarchy.

The next day, 26 January 1952 ("Black Saturday"), what many Egyptians call "the second revolution" broke out (the first being the Egyptian revolution of 1919). King Farouk dismissed Mustafa el-Nahhas's government and declared martial law on the same day.

In the months that followed, three politicians were instructed to form governments, each proving short-lived: Ali Maher (27 January – 1 March), Ahmed Naguib El-Hilali (2 March – 29 June, and 22–23 July) and Hussein Sirri (2–20 July). These "salvation ministries", as they were called, failed to halt the country's downward spiral. Corruption remained ubiquitous despite attempts by successive prime ministers to put their political houses in order.

Stirrings of discontent were felt in the army, and in January 1952 opposition officers supported by the Free Officers gained control of the governing board of the Officers Club. On 16 July, the King annulled these elections, appointing his own supporters instead in an attempt to regain control of the army.

A coup d'état had originally been planned for 5 August, but the coup leaders advanced their plans to the night of 22 July, after General Naguib—one of the Free Officers and General Pasha's temporary replacement as Commander and Chief of the Armed Forces— informed that group on 19 July that the Egyptian Royal Army high command had a list of their names.

Military coup

While the Free Officers planned to overthrow the monarchy on 2–3 August, they decided to make their move earlier after their official leader, Muhammad Naguib, gained knowledge, leaked from the Egyptian cabinet on 19 July, that King Farouk acquired a list of the dissenting officers and was set to arrest them. The officers thus decided to launch a preemptive strike and after finalizing their plans in meeting at the home of Khaled Mohieddin, they began their coup on the night of 22 July. Mohieddin stayed in his home and Anwar Sadat went to the cinema.

Meanwhile, the chairman of the Free Officers, Gamal Abdel Nasser, contacted the Muslim Brotherhood and the Communist Democratic Movement for National Liberation to assure their support. On the morning of 23 July, he and Abdel Hakim Amer left Mohieddin's home in civilian clothes and drove around Cairo in Nasser's automobile to collect men to arrest key royalist commanders before they reached their barracks and gain control over their soldiers. As they approached the el-Qoba Bridge, an artillery unit led by Youssef Seddik met with them before he led his battalion to take control the Military General Headquarters to arrest the royalist army chief of staff, Hussein Sirri Amer and all the other commanders who were present in the building. At 6:00 am the Free Officers Air Force units began circling Cairo's skies.

Declaration of revolution
At 7:30 a.m., a broadcasting station issued the first communiqué of the coup d'état in the name of Gen. Naguib to the Egyptian people. It attempted to justify the coup, which was also known as the "Blessed Movement". The person reading the message was Free Officer and future president of Egypt Anwar Sadat. The coup was conducted by less than a hundred officers – almost all of which were drawn from junior ranks — and prompted scenes of celebration in the streets by cheering mobs.

Egypt has passed through a critical period in her recent history characterized by bribery, mischief, and the absence of governmental stability. All of these were factors that had a large influence on the army. Those who accepted bribes and were thus influenced caused our defeat in the Palestine War [1948]. As for the period following the war, the mischief-making elements have been assisting one another, and traitors have been commanding the army. They appointed a commander who is either ignorant or corrupt. Egypt has reached the point, therefore, of having no army to defend it. Accordingly, we have undertaken to clean ourselves up and have appointed to command us men from within the army whom we trust in their ability, their character, and their patriotism. It is certain that all Egypt will meet this news with enthusiasm and will welcome it. As for those whose arrest we saw fit from among men formerly associated with the army, we will not deal harshly with them, but will release them at the appropriate time. I assure the Egyptian people that the entire army today has become capable of operating in the national interest and under the rule of the constitution apart from any interests of its own. I take this opportunity to request that the people never permit any traitors to take refuge in deeds of destruction or violence because these are not in the interest of Egypt. Should anyone behave in such ways, he will be dealt with forcefully in a manner such as has not been seen before and his deeds will meet immediately the reward for treason. The army will take charge with the assistance of the police. I assure our foreign brothers that their interests, their personal safety [lit. "their souls"], and their property are safe, and that the army considers itself responsible for them. May God grant us success [lit. "God is the guardian of success"].

With his British support network now neutralized, King Farouk sought the intervention of the United States, which was unresponsive. By the 25th, the army had occupied Alexandria, where the King was in residence at the Montaza Palace. Terrified, Farouk abandoned Montaza and fled to Ras Al Teen Palace on the waterfront. Naguib ordered the captain of Farouk's yacht, al-Mahrusa, not to sail without orders from the army.

Debate broke out among the Free Officers concerning the fate of the deposed king. While some (including Gen. Naguib and Nasser) thought that the best course of action was to send him into exile, others argued that he should be put on trial or executed. Finally, the order came for Farouk to abdicate in favour of his son, Crown Prince Ahmed Fuad – who was acceded to the throne as King Fuad II – and a three-man Regency Council was appointed. The former king's departure into exile came on 26 July 1952 and at 6 o'clock that evening he set sail for Italy with protection from the Egyptian army. On 28 July 1953, Muhammad Naguib became the first President of Egypt, which marked the beginning of modern Egyptian governance.

Consolidation

The Revolution Command Council (RCC), made up of the previous nine-member command committee of the Free Officers in addition to five more members, chaired by Naguib, was formed. Ali Maher was asked to form a civilian government. When the Free Officers started isolating elements sympathizing with the Soviet Union, communist cadres led workers riots in Kafr Dawar on 12 August 1952, which resulted in two death sentences. Ali Maher who still sympathized with the British resigned on 7 September following differences with the officers, principally over proposed land reform. Naguib became prime minister, with Nasser as deputy prime minister. On 9 September, the Agrarian Reform Law was passed, which immediately seized any European-owned, especially British owned property in Egypt. This was followed by signaling a major land redistribution programme among peasant farmers which gained most of the seized land. In a bid to stop concentration of land ownership, the regime placed a ceiling of 200 feddans on land ownership. On 9 December, the RCC without due process decreed that the 1923 Constitution of Egypt was abrogated "in the name of the people."

On 16 January 1953 the officers of the RCC dissolved and banned all political parties, declaring a three-year transitional period during which the RCC would rule. A provisional Constitutional Charter, written by the close circle of usurpers, was written with the intention of giving a veneer of legitimacy to the RCC. This new Constitution was proclaimed on 10 February, and the Liberation Rally — the first of three political organisations linked to the July regime — was launched soon afterwards with the aim of mobilizing popular support. The Rally was headed by Nasser and included other Free Officers as secretaries-general. On 18 June, the RCC declared Egypt a republic abolishing the monarchy (the infant son of Farouk had been reigning as King Fuad II) and appointing General Naguib, aged 52, as first president and prime minister. Gamal Abdel Nasser, 35, was appointed deputy premier and minister of the interior. A "Revolutionary Tribunal" consisting of RCC members Abdel Latif Boghdadi, Sadat and Hassan Ibrahim, was set up to try politicians of the ancien régime.

In opposition to the Constitution with its overt secularism was the Muslim Brotherhood. Additionally, contrary to orders issued by the council, members of the Liberation Rally accumulated much of the seized non-Muslim property and distributed amongst their closed networks. Angered at being left out of the political and economic spoils and seeing a continuation of secularism and modernity within the Free Officers Movement such as had existed under the King, the Muslim Brotherhood organized its street elements. From June 1953 into the following year, Egypt was wracked by street riots, clashes, arson, and civil tumult as the regime and the Muslim Brotherhood battled for popular support.

1954
In January, the Muslim Brotherhood was outlawed. It remained an illegal political organization until the revolution of 2011. The move came in the wake of clashes between members of the Brotherhood and Liberation Rally student demonstrators on 12 January 1954. March witnessed clashes within the RCC, symbolized in the attempt, ultimately successful, to oust Naguib. The move faced opposition from within the army, and some members of the RCC, especially Khaled Mohieddin, favored a return to constitutional government. On 26 October, an assassination attempt suspected by the Brotherhood was directed at Nasser during a rally in Alexandria. This led to the regime acting against the Brotherhood, executing Brotherhood leaders on 9 December. Nasser subsequently cemented power, first becoming chairman of the RCC, and finally prime minister, with Naguib's constitutional position remaining vague until 14 November, when he was dismissed from office and placed under house arrest.

Meanwhile, the RCC managed to remain united in its opposition to the British and French, specifically in regard to the Suez Canal. Despite continued calls from the RCC, in debates in the United Nations, and pressure from both the U.S. and USSR, the British refused to transfer control of the Canal to the new regime. The RCC began funding and coordinating ever greater attacks on the British and French in the Suez Canal Zone, and Damietta. Finally, on 19 October, Nasser signed a treaty for the evacuation of British troops from Egypt, to be completed over the following 20 months. Two years later, on 18 June 1956, Nasser raised the Egyptian flag over the Canal Zone, announcing the complete evacuation of British troops.

1956
President Nasser announced a new Constitution on 16 January at a popular rally, setting up a presidential system of government in which the president has the power to appoint and dismiss ministers. An elections law was passed on 3 March granting women the right to vote for the first time in Egyptian history. Nasser was elected as the second president of the Republic on 23 June. In 1957, Nasser announced the formation of the National Union (Al-Ittihad Al-Qawmi), paving the way to July elections for the National Assembly, the first parliament since 1952.

Commemoration
The anniversary of the revolution is commemorated on Revolution Day, an annual public holiday in Egypt, on 23 July.

See also

 Project FF
 Nasserism
 Egyptian Revolution of 1919
 2011 Egyptian revolution
 June 2013 Egyptian protests
 History of modern Egypt
 List of modern conflicts in the Middle East
 List of Chiefs of the General Staff of Egypt

References

Further reading
 Watry, David M. Diplomacy at the Brink: Eisenhower, Churchill, and Eden in the Cold War. Baton Rouge: Louisiana State University Press, 2014.

External links

 Egyptian revolution 25/01/11
 The Long Revolution 
 Egyptian Royalty by Ahmed S. Kamel, Hassan Kamel Kelisli-Morali, Georges Soliman and Magda Malek.
 L'Egypte d'antan... Egypt in Bygone Days  by Max Karkegi.

 
Egyptian nationalism
Revolutions in Egypt
1952 in Egypt
20th-century revolutions
Arab nationalism in Egypt
Cold War conflicts
Cold War in Africa
Conflicts in 1952
Egypt–United Kingdom relations
Farouk of Egypt
History of Egypt (1900–present)
Military coups in Egypt
Nasserism
Politics of Egypt
Protests in Egypt
July 1952 events in Africa
1950s coups d'état and coup attempts